Yesterday's Dreams may refer to:

 "Yesterday's Dreams" (song), a 1968 single by the Four Tops
 Yesterday's Dreams (Four Tops album), 1968
 Yesterday's Dreams (Alphonso Johnson album), 1976
 Yesterday's Dreams (TV series), a British romantic drama television series